The following State Routes run through Allegheny County, Pennsylvania:

Traffic Routes
: One of the longest Pennsylvania state routes, this highway's southern terminus is located in Wilkinsburg, at an interchange with Interstate 376. The road then forms that borough's main street as Ardmore Boulevard, before entering Pittsburgh city limits. As the busy Penn Avenue and Washington Boulevard, the highway is a backbone of the northeastern section of the city, serving some of Pittsburgh's richest and poorest neighborhoods. After crossing the Allegheny River via the Senator Robert D. Fleming Bridge, the highway continues as the main drag through a variety of suburban communities. It is four lanes throughout and is frequently lines with businesses all the way to the Butler County line.
: An essential north-south artery, this highway enters Allegheny County from a busy and quickly growing Washington County suburban corridor. The route is generally only four lane and is often congested from well beyond the county line, as it functions as Washington Road through a variety of prestigious suburbs. After entering the City of Pittsburgh, the route is briefly co-signed with I-376, before branching off of the expressway system to cross the Ohio River via the West End Bridge. Another short freeway stretch appears immediately after crossing the river, as the highway joins with Route 65, before becoming independent once again and winding as the often two-lane Marshall Avenue and Perrysville Avenue through a variety of ethnically diverse Pittsburgh neighborhoods. The route alternates between two and four lanes as it serves dense northern suburbs such as West View, before becoming four lanes for the rest of its time in the county after rejoining with its Truck US 19 branch. The highway eventually meets with the Pennsylvania Turnpike in Marshall Township and serves a heavily commercialized corridor, as it leaves Allegheny for Butler County and an increasingly vast extended suburban area.
: This highway marks the original routing of US 19. In the 1940s, two sections of a truck bypass were built to keep heavy vehicles away from the narrow city streets on Pittsburgh's North Side. After the completion of area freeways, the truck designation became irrelevant and the two separate designations were combined. The southern terminus of the route is in the wealthy suburb of Mt. Lebanon. The highway then extends as the narrow and crowded four-lane Liberty Avenue through the dense suburb of Dormont and through Pittsburgh's south-central neighborhoods. The highway then turns to become briefly cosigned with Route 51, before hooking up with Interstates 376 and 279 to cross the Monongahela and Allegheny Rivers via the Fort Pitt Bridge and Fort Duquesne Bridge respectively. At the northern edge of city limits, the highway regains its independence, becoming the wide, four-lane, and business-lined McKnight Road for the rest of its journey. In McCandless, it rejoins its parent and meets its end.
: This major cross-country highway serves as a freeway for almost its entire path through Allegheny County. It enters the region from Washington County in the west, serving as an expressway connection with Weirton, West Virginia. For its first two miles in the county, it functions independently, before US 30 joins its routing on what is known as the Parkway West. In the busy suburb of Robinson Township, US 22/30 joins on with Interstate 376, and it is cosigned in this manner through the city of Pittsburgh and until that route's eastern terminus. On the office park-lined streets of Monroeville, US 22 branches westward, serving as a four-lane connector as it heads toward suburbanized regions in Westmoreland County.

: At a confusing freeway junction in the East Allegheny neighborhood of Pittsburgh, this highway marks its western terminus. The highway begins as a narrow four-lane East Ohio Street, running in this function through the suburbs of Reserve Township and Millvale. Then, the highway transitions into the Allegheny Valley Expressway and serves as the main freeway connector for Pittsburgh's northeastern suburbs. In Harmar Township, the route intersects with the Pennsylvania Turnpike. As the route leaves Allegheny for Butler County, Pittsburgh's suburban regions transition toward rural hills, and the freeway connection continues to Kittanning.
: The famous Lincoln Highway enters Allegheny County from a sparsely portion of southern Beaver County. The first mile encompasses one of the few rural patches of Allegheny County, before the two-lane route becomes much more suburban. Soon, the highway becomes cosigned with US 22 in Findlay Township and then with Interstate 376 as it functions as a portion of the Parkway West. Along with its two associated routes, the highway travels onward through Downtown Pittsburgh and into the city's eastern suburbs as the Parkway East. In Forest Hills, the road becomes independent once again and transitions into a busy four-lane, business-lined highway. As it reaches the Westmoreland County line, suburbia continues to line the major highway all the way to Greensburg.
: A portion of the long planned Mon-Fayette Expressway, this toll highway remains incomplete in its goal to eventually connect Morgantown, West Virginia with Pittsburgh via the Monongahela Valley. The route enters the county from a small suburban corner of riverfront Washington County, then passes on a variety of viaducts on the rolling topography above the development of Jefferson Hills. The highway currently ends at a toll plaza and junction with Route 51. Future plans call for the route to be extended to I-376 in the eastern neighborhoods of Pittsburgh, although no timetable has been set for this expansion.

 (SR 3160)

 (locally maintained)

 (SR 400)

Quadrant Routes

See also

References

External links
 Pennsylvania State Highway Video Inventory

 Allegheny
Allegheny